Warneford Meadow is an area of  of natural grassland immediately south-east of the Warneford Hospital, in Headington, east Oxford, England. The Warneford Meadow is a wild space within urban Oxford. The area has been used by local residents as a public space for recreation for over 50 years.

History
Warneford Meadow was purchased in 1918 by the Warneford Hospital, a psychiatric hospital, following the sale of the adjacent Southfield Farm. The purchase was funded by public subscription, with the aim of providing natural green space for the psychological benefit of patients and the local community. Archaeological trenching performed in 2006 suggested a Roman or pre-Roman settlement, or area of pottery production, in the area of the present meadow.

Geography

Access to the Meadow is gained from either a lane off Hill Top Road, beside the Southfield Park Golf Club, or Roosevelt Drive opposite the 'Little Oxford' housing development (beside the Headington Care Home). The Meadow slopes gradually down from the Hill Top Road end, towards the Boundary Brook, which runs between the Meadow and the Churchill Hospital to the East. Several public paths run across the Meadow. South of the Meadow is the Southfield Park Golf Club and the Meadow is bounded to the west by homes on Hill Top Road. Warneford Meadow also includes an orchard, on the northern border of the Meadow with the Warneford Hospital.

Biodiversity
The Meadow contains species of butterfly, invertebrates, and birds including skylarks and kingfishers. The Meadow forms part of the 'green corridor' which links South Park to the Thames via Boundary Brook. The Meadow's border hedges include blackberries. The Warneford Orchard on the northern edge of the Meadow is over 50 years old and has varieties of apple including the Russian Emperor Alexander. Owls, bats, and badgers are also found in the orchard.

Development

Development of the Meadow is permitted under the Oxford Local Plan 2001–2016. The Oxfordshire & Buckinghamshire Mental Health Partnership NHS Trust (OBMH) submitted two outline planning applications in July 2006, regarding the Meadow. The primary reason for the development, stated by the OBMH management, was the desire to generate capital for the Trust, in order to upgrade patient facilities. In answer to a parliamentary question about the assets of the United Kingdom's NHS as a whole Liam Byrne, the Parliamentary Under-Secretary of State at the Department of Health, revealed that the 'surplus' land at the Warneford Hospital was worth £30,900,000.

The plans for development met with substantial opposition from local residents, led by nearby Residents Associations and the action group 'Friends of Warneford Meadow'.

An application to have the land registered as a Town or Village Green (under section 22 of the Commons Registration Act 1965, amended by section 98 of the Countryside and Rights of Way Act 2000). was launched in December 2006. The application was successful, and Warneford Meadow was designated as a Town Green in April 2009. Oxfordshire and Buckinghamshire Mental Health NHS Foundation Trust challenged the decision in the High Court; the action commenced in February 2010. In March 2010 the High Court upheld the original decision to register the meadow as a Town Green.

Gallery

References

External links
Friends of Warneford Meadow website

Additional information
CPRE Oxfordshire – on Warneford Meadow
The Open Space Society – a UK conservation society supporting the Town Green application
Headington News website on Warneford Meadow
The history of the adjoining Warneford Hospital
The OBMH – outlining their position, 20 November 2007
The Oxford County Council Local Plan

1918 establishments in England
Parks and open spaces in Oxford
Grasslands of the United Kingdom
Meadows in Oxfordshire
2010 controversies